Yangmei is a town located in Rong County, Yulin, Guangxi, China. It is named after the fruit yangmei (Myrica rubra).

The town's population is approximately 5,3000. In May 2007, Affected by the protest of Bobai, Yangmei was the site of large protests held by local people against China's one-child policy.

References

Towns of Guangxi
Rong County, Guangxi